Yassine Haddou (born 21 May 1989 in Narbonne) is a professional footballer who plays as a defender for FU Narbonne. He formerly played for Nîmes Olympique for five seasons.

International career
Haddou was born in France to parents of Moroccan descent. He was called up by the Morocco national under-20 football team for the 2012 Toulon Tournament, and made one appearance.

References

External links
 Yassine Haddou at foot-national.com
 
 
 

1989 births
Living people
People from Narbonne
Moroccan footballers
Morocco under-20 international footballers
French footballers
French sportspeople of Moroccan descent
Association football defenders
Nîmes Olympique players
Olympic Club de Safi players
US Boulogne players
Amiens SC players
Ligue 2 players
Championnat National players
Association football midfielders
ES Paulhan-Pézenas players
Sportspeople from Aude
Footballers from Occitania (administrative region)